Firmin Bouisset (2 September 1859 – 19 March 1925) was a French painter, poster artist and printmaker.

Early life
He was born on 2 September 1859 in the town of Moissac in the Tarn-et-Garonne département in southwestern France. As an artist, Bouisset specialized in painting children subjects and did a number of illustrated books such as La Petite Ménagère (The Little Housekeeper) in 1890.

Career
At a time when posters were a popular form of advertising, Bouisset created posters with enduring images for a number of different French food companies such as Maggi and Lefèvre-Utile. For the latter company, he used their LU initials as an ad logo as part of an 1897 poster image for a line of butter biscuits featuring Petit Ecolier ("The Little Schoolboy"). A variation is still being used by the company today.

In 1892, Bouisset was contracted by French chocolate manufacturer Menier for an advertising poster. He used his daughter Yvonne as a model to create what became an iconic image of a little girl using a piece of chocolate to write the company's name. The drawing was featured on a great many of the Menier company's advertisements and on its packaged products as well as on promotional items such as creamers, bowls, sugar dishes, plates, canister sets, ashtrays, thermometers, key chains, and even children's exercise books.

Bouisset's work was part of the Maîtres de l'Affiche as well as L'Estampe Moderne, the leading publisher of original French prints during the late nineteenth century. Today, many of his posters are very popular with collectors. Because they are no longer copyright protected, they are often duplicated and sold on the Internet and in retail outlets in many countries.

Firmin Bouisset died in Paris on 19 March 1925.

References

19th-century French painters
20th-century French painters
20th-century French male artists
French illustrators
French poster artists
1859 births
1925 deaths
19th-century French male artists